Andrew Belcher may refer to:

 Andrew Belcher (merchant, born 1706) (1706–1771), American merchant and Governor's Council member in the Province of Massachusetts Bay
 Andrew Belcher (merchant, born 1763) (1763–1841), British North American merchant and politician in Halifax, Nova Scotia